The 17th Rhythmic Gymnastics European Championships were held in Geneva, Switzerland, from 15 to 17 June 2001.
Medals were contested in two disciplines : senior individuals and senior groups.

Medal winners

Individual

Rope

Hoop

Ball

Clubs

Groups

Senior All-Around

Final Senior 5 Clubs

Final Senior 2 balls 3 ropes

Final Junior 5 Ropes

Medals table

References 

Rhythmic Gymnastics European Championships
2001 in gymnastics